Blue Blood is the second studio album by Japanese rock band X Japan, then known as simply X. It was released on April 21, 1989, by CBS/Sony as the band's major label debut. Blue Blood sold more than 700,000 copies, reached number 6 on the Oricon chart and stayed on the chart for more than 100 weeks. The album's singles would also reach the top five on the chart. In 2007, Rolling Stone Japan ranked Blue Blood number 15 on their list of the "100 Greatest Japanese Rock Albums of All Time".

Overview

On December 26, 1987, X participated in an audition held by CBS/Sony, which led to a recording contract in August of the following year. In the meantime, the band released their first album, Vanishing Vision, through Extasy Records owned by Yoshiki, on April 14, 1988 and toured extensively in support of the record.

Recording for their major label debut album, Blue Blood, began in January 1989. It was released on April 21, 1989, during the band's tour of the same name which began on March 13. Two of the concerts sold out in advance, including the March 16 show at Shibuya Public Hall, which was later released on home video as Blue Blood Tour Bakuhatsu Sunzen Gig. X went on the Rose & Blood Tour in September, which was temporarily suspended when Yoshiki collapsed after a November 22 concert, but then continued into May 1990. Their success earned the band the "Grand Prix New Artist of the Year" award at the 4th annual Japan Gold Disc Awards in 1990.

A special edition of Blue Blood, which included a second disc of instrumental versions of some songs, was released on February 14, 2007, and reached number 23 on the Oricon chart. A remastered version which reached number 165 was released on March 19, 2008.

Composition
Blue Blood contains re-recordings of songs from their second single "Orgasm", the title track, "X", as well as "Kurenai" and "Unfinished" from their debut album Vanishing Vision, all with alternate/expanded lyrics. "Easy Fight Rambling" is a glam metal song, while "Kurenai" exemplifies the band's trademark mix of speed metal, ballad and symphonic elements. The intro track "Prologue (~ World Anthem)" is a re-working of the 1977 Mahogany Rush song "The World Anthem" originally written by Frank Marino, hence its title and Marino being credited as composer.

Blue Blood leans more towards symphonic metal than its predecessor, with "Rose of Pain" including portions from Johann Sebastian Bach's "Fugue in G Minor". "Endless Rain", a power ballad, also features classical piano and strings in the background.

The songs "X" and "Orgasm" have many of X's friends, fellow musicians and members of bands on Extasy Records providing backing vocals, namely Baki from Gastunk, Tusk, Ken and Seiichi from Zi:Kill, Haruhiko Ash (The Zolge, Eve of Destiny), and members of Ladies Room.

Release

The album was released on April 21, 1989, by major label CBS/Sony. In the initial counting week of May it reached number six on the Oricon chart, with sales of 28,160 copies. By the end of the year it had sold 188,940 copies, was the 63rd best-selling album of the year, and in 1990 with 378,910 copies, was the 28th best-selling album. In December 1989, it was certified gold by RIAJ. As it charted for 108 weeks, in 2007 Oricon counted 712,000 sold copies. Originally released simultaneously on double LP and single CD (with different track orders), a remastered edition was released on February 14, 2007, and included a bonus CD with instrumental versions of some songs. This edition reached number twenty-three on the chart.

All of the singles were certified Gold, meaning at least two hundred thousand copies sold, by the RIAJ. "Kurenai" became the band's first single to reach the top five on the charts. The song reached number five on the second counting week of September 1989, with sales of 20,930 copies. It charted for 39 weeks, the longest of any other band's singles. In 1989, with sales of 133,090 copies, it was the 74th best-selling single of the year, and in 1990, with 176,450 copies was the 67th best-selling single.

The second single, the ballad "Endless Rain" became X's first to reach the top three on the charts. It reached number three on the second counting week of December 1989, with sales of 40,690 copies. It is the second longest charting single with 31 weeks. In 1990, with 357,680 copies sold was the 21st best-selling single of the year.

The third single, "Week End", became the band's first to reach the top two on the charts. It reached number two in the fifth counting week of April 1990, with sales of 85,060 copies. In the upcoming weeks, it was at number three and five respectively, with sales of 51,490, and 39,590 copies. In 1990, with 291,440 copies sold, it was the 32nd best-selling single of the year.

Reception

Blue Blood is generally positively received. Alexey Eremenko, of Allmusic, said "staying on the coordinate grid set by Iron Maiden, Guns N' Roses, Queensrÿche and perhaps updated Thin Lizzy, with the results being not too far from what Helloween were doing at the time", also argues that "whether or not the Germans influenced X Japan is up for debate, but the similarities are obvious, as the Japanese exhibit the same aptness for combining menacing guitar work with anthemic... cinematic... melodies". Eremenko, who gave the album a three and a half out of five stars rating, concluded that the album "generally packs enough skill and enthusiasm to deliver the goods on par with its best genre associates, even if clearly following in their footsteps."

Carl Begai said that "Blue Blood is and will remain one of the few damn near perfect albums in my eyes for the simple fact it never lets up and never gets lazy, even when things slow down for a cheeseball ballad or two." He wrote that with it X "created some of the boldest music I’d ever heard, daring to thrash through tracks like ‘X’, and ‘Orgasm’, serve up epics like ‘Rose Of Pain’ and ‘Kurenai’ (one of my Top 3 metal songs of all time), [and] deliver a song like ‘Endless Rain’ that Elton John would be happy to call his own, and all on the same album." Something unheard of by Western metal standards. He also called Pata and hide two of the most underrated/undiscovered guitarists around.

Rolling Stone referred to "Endless Rain" as "November Rain, minus the bullshit."

On their 2007 list of the "100 Greatest Japanese Rock Albums of All Time", Rolling Stone Japan ranked Blue Blood number 15. It was named one of the top albums from 1989–1998 in a 2004 issue of the music magazine Band Yarouze. In 2021, Kerrang! included Blue Blood on a list of 13 essential Japanese rock and metal albums.

Legacy
The term visual kei was derived from the slogan "Psychedelic Violence Crime of Visual Shock" seen on cover of the album and used to describe the music scene which X Japan pioneered.

Several songs from the record remain mainstays in X Japan's live sets. Such as "Kurenai", which is one of their signature songs, being played at most of their concerts, often accompanied by the stage being lit in red light (Kurenai translates as "crimson") and the band pausing during the last third in order to let the audience sing the chorus on their own. Other popular songs from the album are "X", "Endless Rain", and "Week End".

"Celebration" was covered by I.N.A., Pata and Heath, with vocals by hide, on the 1999 hide tribute album Tribute Spirits. hide also performed the song live during some of his solo concerts, and a studio version was completed after his death and put on the 2002 Singles ~ Junk Story compilation. Argentinian metal band Auvernia covered "Blue Blood" on their 2008 album Towards Eternity. "Kurenai" was covered by Matenrou Opera for Crush! -90's V-Rock Best Hit Cover Songs-, a compilation album released on January 26, 2011 that features current visual kei bands covering songs from bands that were important to the '90s visual kei movement. Inzargi, vocalist of Megamasso, covered "X" for his 2012 cover album.

Track listing

Double LP release

CD release

Personnel

X
Vocals: Toshi 
Guitar: Pata
Guitar: hide 
Bass: Taiji 
Drums, piano: Yoshiki

Additional performers
Chorus on "X": Baki (Gastunk), Haruhiko (Zolge), Act Ishi (God), Ei-chan (Poison Arts), Butaman (Tetsu-Arai), Hara & Seiji (EX-ANS), Harry, Minami & Yuji (Sighs of Love Potion), George, Ken, Jun & Sanpei (Ladies Room)
Chorus on "Orgasm": Baki (Gastunk), Butaman (Tetsu-Arai), Ishiya & Chelsea (Death Side), Montes (Squad), Windy (Crime Hate), Gazelle (Asylum), Hara & Seiji (EX-ANS), George, Ken, Jun & Sanpei (Ladies Room), Tusk, Ken & Seiichi (G-Kill), Koji Yoshida (Band-Yaroze), Mr. Hosoi (Rockin'f), Satoshi, Itoh & Kudo (3rd), Mr. Abe & Okubo (Engineers)
Concertmaster: Great Eida
Conductor, Arranger: Takeshi "Neko" Saitoh

Production
Producer: X
Co-producer, Director: Naoshi Tsuda
Executive producer: Yoshikatsu Inoue
Assistant engineer: Akiko Nakamura, Naoki Yamada, Shigeki Kashii, Takashi Ohkubo
Recorded by: Mitsuyasu Abe, Tetsuhiro Miyajima 
Percussion on "Xclamation #1" recorded by: Noritaka Ubukata in Bombay, India
Mixed: Motonari Matsumoto 
Mixed, Recorded: Gremlin
Digital Mastering: Mitsukazu "Quincy" Tanaka
Creative director: Shigeo Gotoh 
Art direction, Design: Masayoshi Nakajo 
Design (inner-card): Takashi Miyagawa 
Photographer: Peter Calvin

Notes

References

X Japan albums
1989 albums